Rainbow Drive is a 1990 American made-for-television thriller film directed by Bobby Roth and starring Peter Weller, Sela Ward and David Caruso. The film first aired on September 8, 1990, on the Showtime Cable Network. It is based on the 1986 novel of the same name by Roderick Thorp.

Rainbow Drive was given a very limited theatrical release. It was released in America and the UK on VHS. The film was nominated for one Mystfest award, for "Best Film" (Bobby Roth). The soundtrack was scored by Tangerine Dream, but was never released as a stand-alone release. The title track was later included on the bootleg Prayer of Quiet Dreams in 1993.

Plot
Mike Gallagher is one of Los Angeles' top cops, who is acting head of Hollywood's homicide division. But Gallagher is soon wrenched out of his orderly existence into a dirty world of killing and corruption. Gallagher's affair with a married woman leads him to stumble across a vicious scene of multiple murders on L.A. highway Rainbow Drive. Gallagher senses something strange when reinforcements arrive even before he has called them. When his superiors freeze him out of the case, Gallagher begins his own investigation. With the help of mysterious ally Laura Demming, Gallagher draws closer to the truth, and danger moves closer to his partner and mistress. His investigation propels him into a web of drugs and vice, corruption and cover-up - an intricate web that implicates some of the city's most senior figures.

Cast
 Peter Weller as Mike Gallagher
 Sela Ward as Laura Demming
 David Caruso as Larry Hammond
 Tony Jay as Max Hollister
 James Laurenson as Hans Roehrig
 Jon Gries as Azzolini
 Henry G. Sanders as Marvin Burgess
 Chris Mulkey as Ira Rosenberg
 David Neidorf as Bernie Maxwell
 Bruce Weitz as Dan Crawford
 Chelcie Ross as Tom Cutler
 Rutanya Alda as Marge Crawford
 Megan Mullally as Ava Zieff
 Michael Bruce as Rudy

Critical reception
Jason Ankeny of Allmovie gave the film three out of five stars, stating: "In this made-for-cable adaptation of Roderick Thorp's crime thriller, Peter Weller stars as a Hollywood cop whose murder investigation runs into a wall of police corruption." The book Video Movie Guide 1996 awarded the film two and a half stars out of five, while VideoHound's Golden Movie Retriever gave the film two out of five stars.

References

External links
 

1990 films
1990 television films
1990 thriller films
Films set in Los Angeles
Films scored by Tangerine Dream
Films directed by Bobby Roth
Showtime (TV network) films
American thriller films
1990s English-language films
1990s American films